The Daraudi River (or Daraundi Khola) is a river in Nepal. It is a left tributary of the Marshyangdi river, which in turn joins the Trishuli River.

Hydroelectricity

The flow from the Daraudi River is used to generate 6 MW electricity at the Daraudi A Hydropower Plant located in the former Muchok, Takumajh Lakuribot and Saurpani VDCs of Gorkha District.
It was assumed that the Daraundu hydropower project and dam would obstruct migration of fish up the river and severely reduce their population.

Lower section

The runoff-rainfall ratio is 1.03.

Notes

Sources

Rivers of Gandaki Province